Among ancient English writers, a frithstool, frith stool or fridstool signified a seat, chair, or place of peace, in reference to the Anglo-Saxon concept of frith.

The most famous surviving examples are in Beverley Minster and Hexham Abbey. That in Beverley has the inscription Haec sedes lapidea Freedstoll dicitur, i.e. Pacis Cathedra, ad quam reus fugiendo perveniens, omnimodam habet securitatem.

Also, fridstoll or frithstow, Old English frithstól, frythstól, freedstool, fridstool, meaning (a). Old English only, A place of safety; a refuge; (b). A seat, usually of stone, formerly placed near the altar in some churches, which afforded inviolable protection to those who sought privilege of sanctuary.

The term also signified a palace, which was usually a privileged place.

See also
frith
grith
Cities of Refuge
right of asylum
sanctuary
sanctuary city

References

Social institutions
Buildings and structures in England